The 1973 European Formula Two season was contested over 17 rounds. STP March Racing Team driver Jean-Pierre Jarier clinched the championship title.

Calendar

Note:

Race 1, 2, 6, 7, 8, 10, 11, 13, 15 and 17 were held in two heats, with results shown in aggregate.

Race 3, 5, 9 and 12 were held with two semi-final heats and the final run, with time only shown for the final.

Race 3, 4, 5 and 15 were won by graded drivers, all graded drivers are shown in Italics

Race 9 Gerry Birrell was fatally injured in practice.

Final point standings

Driver

For every race points were awarded: 9 points to the winner, 6 for runner-up, 4 for third place, 3 for fourth place, 2 for fifth place and 1 for sixth place. No additional points were awarded. All scores from basic events counts: Race No. 2, 3, 4, 7, 9, 11, 13, 16 and 17. Also the first four starts (not scores) in the complementary races counts: Race No. 1, 5, 6, 8, 10, 12, 14 and 15. But only the first result in any country of the complementary races counts.

Note:

Only drivers which were not graded were able to score points.

Race 6 and 15 not all points were awarded (not enough finishers).

Vittorio Brambilla had nine points deducted for his win at Austria, because this was his fifth start in a complementary race. He had also raced in race No. 1, 5, 8 and 10.

Bill Gubelmann had two points deducted for his fifth place at Karlskoga, because this was his second start in a complementary race in Sweden. He had also raced in race No. 6.

Tom Pryce had nine points deducted for his win at Norisring, because this was his second start in a complementary race in Germany. He had also raced in race No. 8.

References

Formula Two
European Formula Two Championship seasons